Dudley South is a constituency represented in the House of Commons of the UK Parliament since 2015 by Mike Wood of the Conservative Party.

Members of Parliament

Boundaries

Dudley South is one of four constituencies covering the Metropolitan Borough of Dudley, and covers the central part of the borough to the south of the town centre.

2010–present: The Metropolitan Borough of Dudley wards of Brierley Hill, Brockmoor and Pensnett, Kingswinford North and Wall Heath, Kingswinford South, Netherton, Woodside and St Andrews, and Wordsley.

1997–2010: The Metropolitan Borough of Dudley wards of Brierley Hill, Brockmoor and Pensnett, Kingswinford North and Wall Heath, Kingswinford South, Netherton and Woodside, St Andrews, and Wordsley.

History
Before the 1997 election, Dudley was divided into East and West constituencies, rather than North and South. Dudley South covers most of the area previously covered by Dudley West, which included Sedgley but excluded Netherton.

Dudley West was the scene of a by-election in 1994, held after the death of the Conservative John Blackburn who had represented the constituency since 1979.  The by-election was won by Labour's Ian Pearson, who stood for Dudley South in 1997 and held the seat, winning by a comfortable margin each time, until he stood down in 2010.

The Conservative candidate, Chris Kelly, gained the seat in the subsequent general election. However, he decided to stand down in 2015.

Mike Wood retained the seat for the Conservatives in both the 2015 and 2017 general elections, in both cases achieving a swing towards his party and thus bucking the national trend.

Elections

Elections in the 2010s

-->

-->

Elections in the 2000s

Elections in the 1990s

See also
 List of parliamentary constituencies in the West Midlands (county)
 List of parliamentary constituencies in Dudley

Notes

References

Politics of Dudley
Parliamentary constituencies in the West Midlands (county)
Constituencies of the Parliament of the United Kingdom established in 1997